The 2015 Southeastern Conference women's basketball tournament was the postseason women's basketball tournament for the Southeastern Conference held at Verizon Arena, now known as Simmons Bank Arena. in North Little Rock, Arkansas from March 4 through 8, 2015. The tournament consisted of five rounds and included all 14 SEC teams. Seeds 5 through 10 received a first-round bye, and the top four seeds received a "double bye" through the first and second rounds.

Seeds

Schedule

Bracket

Tourney awards

 MVP – Aleighsa Welch, South Carolina
 All-Tournament Team – Makayla Epps (Kentucky), Cierra Burdick (Tennessee), Jordan Reynolds (Tennessee), Aleighsa Welch (South Carolina), and Alaina Coates (South Carolina)

See also
2015 SEC men's basketball tournament

References

External links
 

2014–15 Southeastern Conference women's basketball season
SEC women's basketball tournament
Sports in Little Rock, Arkansas
2015 in sports in Arkansas
College sports tournaments in Arkansas